Giovanni Angelo Borroni (1684–1772) was an Italian painter of the late-Baroque and early-Neoclassic periods, active mainly in Milan and Cremona.

Biography
He was born in Cremona and died in Milan. He was the pupil of the painter Angelo Massarotti, and afterwards of Robert de Longe. On leaving those masters he was patronized by the noble family of Crivelli, and was employed some years in ornamenting their palace. He painted several pictures for the churches at Cremona and Milan. In the Cathedral of Milan he painted St. Benedict in the act of interceding for the city.  He painted frescoes on mythologic themes for the Palazzo Mezzabarba, Palazzo Botta Adorno in Pavia and for the Villa Brentano Carones in Corbetta, along with Mattia Bortoloni. He also painted a Glory of the Saint (1755) for the cupola of the church dedicated to San Omobono of Cremona.

References

1684 births
1772 deaths
17th-century Italian painters
Italian male painters
18th-century Italian painters
Painters from Cremona
Italian Baroque painters
Fresco painters
18th-century Italian male artists